Deep Purple are a British hard rock band originally from Hertford. Formed in March 1968, the group originally included vocalist Rod Evans, guitarist Ritchie Blackmore, bassist Nick Simper, keyboardist Jon Lord and drummer Ian Paice ("Mark I"). Evans and Simper were soon replaced by Ian Gillan and Roger Glover ("Mark II"). When they broke up for the first time in July 1976 the band featured Lord, Paice, vocalist David Coverdale, bassist / vocalist Glenn Hughes, and guitarist / vocalist Tommy Bolin ("Mark IV"). The group reformed in April 1984 with their "Mark II" lineup of Blackmore, Lord, Paice, Gillan and Glover. The current lineup, dubbed "Mark IX", features Paice, Gillan, Glover, guitarist Simon McBride and keyboardist Don Airey.

History

1968–1976
Deep Purple were formed under the name Roundabout in March 1968 by vocalist Rod Evans, guitarist Ritchie Blackmore, bassist Nick Simper, keyboardist Jon Lord and drummer Ian Paice. Lord and Simper had previously played together with The Flower Pot Men, and the bassist had earlier worked briefly with Blackmore; Evans and Paice were brought in from The Maze, whom the guitarist had seen performing. The group soon changed their name to Deep Purple, after the song of the same name by Nino Tempo & April Stevens. Deep Purple quickly recorded their first album Shades of Deep Purple, which was issued in July 1968. After The Book of Taliesyn and Deep Purple, Blackmore, Lord and Paice made the decision in May 1969 to dismiss Evans and Simper, wanting to pursue a heavier direction for which they deemed the pair unsuitable.

By the time the original lineup, subsequently dubbed "Mark I", played their last show on 4 July 1969, new vocalist Ian Gillan and bassist Roger Glover had already been recruited from Episode Six. During its four-year tenure, the "Mark II" lineup established itself as the most commercially and critically acclaimed of the group's history, releasing the studio albums Deep Purple in Rock, Fireball, Machine Head and Who Do We Think We Are, in addition to the live albums Concerto for Group and Orchestra and Made in Japan. However, following increasing tensions and exhaustion, in October 1972 Gillan informed the rest of the band that he would be leaving after the remaining tour dates were completed. Glover followed the singer later in providing his resignation, believing that Blackmore wanted him to leave. The final show of the tour took place on 29 June 1973 in Osaka, Japan, after which Gillan and Glover both left and "Mark II" came to an end.

On 14 July 1973, it was announced in Melody Maker magazine that Glenn Hughes of Trapeze had replaced Glover on bass. Paul Rodgers, who had been a member of Free until their recent breakup, was initially offered the role of frontman, but he declined to focus on the formation of Bad Company. The position vacated by Gillan was later taken by David Coverdale, who auditioned in the summer and was unveiled as Deep Purple's new vocalist on 23 September 1973. After "Mark III" released Burn and Stormbringer, the creatively frustrated Blackmore recorded a self-titled debut album by a new project dubbed Ritchie Blackmore's Rainbow (later shortened to just Rainbow) in early 1975. This ultimately led to his departure from Deep Purple, which was officially announced on 21 June 1975. Despite Blackmore's core creative role in the band, Deep Purple continued with the addition of former James Gang guitarist Tommy Bolin. After just one album, Come Taste the Band, "Mark IV" played their final show on 15 March 1976, before breaking up officially on 19 July. Bolin died of a heroin overdose that December.

1984 onwards
After eight years of inactivity, on 27 April 1984 it was announced that the "Mark II" lineup of Deep Purple were set to return for a worldwide tour and a new album. The reunion of Gillan, Blackmore, Glover, Lord and Paice lasted for five years and spawned two studio albums, Perfect Strangers and The House of Blue Light. By the middle of 1989, however, Gillan had left the group for a second time, with the other members firing him due to creative and personal differences. After auditioning and rehearsing with numerous potential replacements for the vocalist, the band eventually enlisted Joe Lynn Turner, who had previously worked with Blackmore and Glover in Rainbow, to take Gillan's place in December 1989. This "Mark V" lineup recorded just one album, Slaves and Masters, which was released in 1990 and promoted on tour throughout 1991.

In August 1992, despite having started work on the band's next album, Turner was suddenly dismissed from Deep Purple. Gillan subsequently returned for a third stint as lead vocalist, as management wanted the classic "Mark II" lineup back together for a planned 25th anniversary tour, and the band issued The Battle Rages On... in 1993. Blackmore was unhappy with Gillan's return and Turner's firing, however, which led to renewed and increasing tensions between the pair on the subsequent touring cycle. The guitarist played his final show with Deep Purple on 17 November 1993. After briefly considering disbanding, the band added Joe Satriani in Blackmore's place for a string of pre-arranged tour dates, including shows in Japan and Europe starting in December. This "Mark VI" arrangement was only temporary, however, with the guitarist returning to his solo career at the end of the run in July 1994.

Blackmore was eventually officially replaced by former Dixie Dregs and Kansas guitarist Steve Morse on August 17, 1994, who debuted with the band at three low-key gigs in November 1994 and was later offered the position permanently. The "Mark VII" lineup remained stable throughout the rest of the decade, releasing two studio albums in Purpendicular and Abandon. In March 2002, it was announced that Lord – a member of every lineup of Deep Purple to date – was set to amicably retire from the group, with Don Airey taking his place. The keyboardist's departure left Paice as the sole remaining constant member of the band. The "Mark VIII" lineup of Gillan, Morse, Glover, Airey and Paice released six studio albums: Bananas in 2003, Rapture of the Deep in 2005, Now What?! in 2013, Infinite in 2017, Whoosh! in 2020 and Turning to Crime in 2021. The lineup remained active until March 2022, when the band announced that Steve Morse would go on a hiatus and be replaced by Simon McBride, who has previously toured with both Ian Gillan and Don Airey. On 23 July 2022, it was announced that Steve Morse had permanently left.

Members

Current

Former

Touring

Timeline

Lineups

References

External links
Deep Purple official website

Deep Purple